In linear algebra, a symmetric matrix is a square matrix that is equal to its transpose. Formally,

Because equal matrices have equal dimensions, only square matrices can be symmetric.

The entries of a symmetric matrix are symmetric with respect to the main diagonal. So if  denotes the entry in the th row and th column then

for all indices  and 

Every square diagonal matrix is symmetric, since all off-diagonal elements are zero. Similarly in characteristic different from 2, each diagonal element of a skew-symmetric matrix must be zero, since each is its own negative.

In linear algebra, a real symmetric matrix represents a self-adjoint operator represented in an orthonormal basis over a real inner product space. The corresponding object for a complex inner product space is a Hermitian matrix with complex-valued entries, which is equal to its conjugate transpose. Therefore, in linear algebra over the complex numbers, it is often assumed that a symmetric matrix refers to one which has real-valued entries.  Symmetric matrices appear naturally in a variety of applications, and typical numerical linear algebra software makes special accommodations for them.

Example 
The following  matrix is symmetric:

Since .

Properties

Basic properties
 The sum and difference of two symmetric matrices is symmetric.
 For any integer ,  is symmetric if  is symmetric.
 If  exists, it is symmetric if and only if  is symmetric.

Decomposition into symmetric and skew-symmetric
Any square matrix can uniquely be written as sum of a symmetric and a skew-symmetric matrix. This decomposition is known as the Toeplitz decomposition. Let  denote the space of  matrices.

where  denotes the direct sum. Let  then

This is true for every square matrix  with entries from any field whose characteristic is different from 2.

A symmetric  matrix is determined by  scalars (the number of entries on or above the main diagonal). Similarly, a skew-symmetric matrix is determined by  scalars (the number of entries above the main diagonal).

Matrix congruent to a symmetric matrix 

Symmetry implies normality 
A (real-valued) symmetric matrix is necessarily a normal matrix.

Real symmetric matrices 

The real  matrix  is symmetric if and only if

Since this definition is independent of the choice of basis, symmetry is a property that depends only on the linear operator A and a choice of inner product. This characterization of symmetry is useful, for example, in differential geometry, for each tangent space to a manifold may be endowed with an inner product, giving rise to what is called a Riemannian manifold. Another area where this formulation is used is in Hilbert spaces.

The finite-dimensional spectral theorem says that any symmetric matrix whose entries are real can be diagonalized by an orthogonal matrix. More explicitly: For every real symmetric matrix  there exists a real orthogonal matrix  such that  is a diagonal matrix. Every real symmetric matrix is thus, up to choice of an orthonormal basis, a diagonal matrix.

Every real symmetric matrix is Hermitian, and therefore all its eigenvalues are real. (In fact, the eigenvalues are the entries in the diagonal matrix  (above), and therefore  is uniquely determined by  up to the order of its entries.) Essentially, the property of being symmetric for real matrices corresponds to the property of being Hermitian for complex matrices.

Complex symmetric matrices 
A complex symmetric matrix can be 'diagonalized' using a unitary matrix: thus if  is a complex symmetric matrix, there is a unitary matrix  such that   is a real diagonal matrix with non-negative entries. This result is referred to as the Autonne–Takagi factorization. It was originally proved by Léon Autonne (1915) and Teiji Takagi (1925) and rediscovered with different proofs by several other mathematicians. In fact, the matrix  is Hermitian and positive semi-definite, so there is a unitary matrix  such that  is diagonal with non-negative real entries. Thus  is complex symmetric with  real. Thus . Setting  (a unitary matrix), the matrix  is complex diagonal. Pre-multiplying  by a suitable diagonal unitary matrix (which preserves unitarity of ), the diagonal entries of  can be made to be real and non-negative as desired. Clearly  as desired, so we make the modification . (Note, about the eigen-decomposition of a complex symmetric matrix , the Jordan normal form of  may not be diagonal, therefore  may not be diagonalized by any similarity transformation.)

Decomposition 
Using the Jordan normal form, one can prove that every square real matrix can be written as a product of two real symmetric matrices, and every square complex matrix can be written as a product of two complex symmetric matrices.

Every real non-singular matrix can be uniquely factored as the product of an orthogonal matrix and a symmetric positive definite matrix, which is called a polar decomposition. Singular matrices can also be factored, but not uniquely.

Cholesky decomposition states that every real positive-definite symmetric matrix  is a product of a lower-triangular matrix  and its transpose,

A general (complex) symmetric matrix may be defective and thus not be diagonalizable. If  is diagonalizable it may be decomposed as

Then

Hessian 
Symmetric  matrices of real functions appear as the Hessians of twice differentiable functions of  real variables (the continuity of the second derivative is not needed, despite common belief to the opposite). 

Every quadratic form  on  can be uniquely written in the form  with a symmetric  matrix .

with real numbers . This considerably simplifies the study of quadratic forms, as well as the study of the level sets  which are generalizations of conic sections.

This is important partly because the second-order behavior of every smooth multi-variable function is described by the quadratic form belonging to the function's Hessian; this is a consequence of Taylor's theorem.

Symmetrizable matrix 
An  matrix  is said to be symmetrizable if there exists an invertible diagonal matrix  and symmetric matrix  such that 

A matrix  is symmetrizable if and only if the following conditions are met:
  implies  for all 
  for any finite sequence

See also 

Other types of symmetry or pattern in square matrices have special names; see for example:

 Skew-symmetric matrix (also called antisymmetric or antimetric) 
 Centrosymmetric matrix
 Circulant matrix
 Covariance matrix
 Coxeter matrix
 GCD matrix
 Hankel matrix
 Hilbert matrix
 Persymmetric matrix
 Sylvester's law of inertia
 Toeplitz matrix
 Transpositions matrix

See also symmetry in mathematics.

Notes

References

External links 
 
 A brief introduction and proof of eigenvalue properties of the real symmetric matrix
 How to implement a Symmetric Matrix in C++

Matrices